Rubha nan Gall lighthouse is located north of Tobermory on the Isle of Mull beside the Sound of Mull. The name means "Stranger's Point" in Scottish Gaelic. It was built in 1857 by David and Thomas Stevenson and is operated by the Northern Lighthouse Board. The lighthouse was automated in 1960 and the nearby former keepers' cottages are privately owned.

In August 2013, the former keepers' cottages were sold and after extensive renovation work, one is a private home and the other is a self-catering cottage. Access is by sea or a  footpath from Tobermory along the steep wooded coastline. The cottages have no mains electricity or water; instead a private spring supplies water, while an off-grid solar system provides power.

See also

 List of lighthouses in Scotland
 List of Northern Lighthouse Board lighthouses

References

External links

 Northern Lighthouse Board
 

Category C listed buildings in Argyll and Bute
Category C listed lighthouses
Lighthouses in Scotland